The Yakhroma is a right tributary of the Sestra that flows through a network of peat marshes in the north of Moscow Oblast, Russia. It passes through the towns of Dmitrov and Yakhroma, crossing the Moscow Canal on its way. The construction of the Moscow Canal has separated the upper course of the Yakhroma from its lower course.

Tributaries
 Volgusha
 Berezovetc
 Kuholka
 Dyatlinka
 Lbovka

References 

Rivers of Moscow Oblast